The Bank of Guam Strykers FC are a professional association football club based in Guam. Strykers FC have never won a Guam Soccer League title nor domestic cup to this date, but still remain a dominant force in Guamanian soccer. They underwent many name changes throughout the years, including Paintco Strykers and Payless Supermarket Strykers (named for its past sponsor, the food purveyors Payless Supermarkets) to name a few.

The club's youth team claimed victory to take home Guam's first Minetgot Cup Elite Youth League title and trophy.

Aside from a football section, they have a successful beach soccer section which won the Land Shark Beach Soccer league in 2016.

Origin

Founded by Keith Dickson in 2005, it now comprises over 16 teams engaging in different league of the Guam Football Association.

Squad players

Squad women players

Honors
 Guam FA Cup 2015 runners-up

References

Football clubs in Guam
2005 establishments in Guam
Association football clubs established in 2005